The crimson-crowned flowerpecker (Dicaeum nehrkorni) is a species of bird in the family Dicaeidae. It is endemic to the island of Sulawesi in Indonesia. Its natural habitats are subtropical or tropical moist lowland forest and subtropical or tropical moist montane forest.

References

Dicaeum
Endemic birds of Sulawesi
Birds described in 1886
Taxa named by August Wilhelm Heinrich Blasius
Taxonomy articles created by Polbot